The French International Ladies Amateur Championship, known since 1998 also as the Cécile de Rothschild Trophy, is an annual amateur golf tournament in France for women.

This stroke play championship, contested over 54 holes, was first held in 1962, making it the oldest such international ladies amateur championship in Europe. The British equivalent, the British Ladies Amateur Stroke Play Championship, was created several years later.

Initially it attracted little international interest and the title was contested mainly between French players. Brigitte Varangot, Catherine Lacoste and Odile Garaïalde dominated the event in the early years. By the 1990s the championship was attracting an international field and in 1992 the Spaniard Estefania Knuth won the title, followed in second place by her compatriot Laura Navarro.

Between 1994 and 2002 the tournament was contested every other year, alternating with the International de France Match Play, which was discontinued in 2001. Since 1998, due to a donation from Nathaniel de Rothschild, the winner is presented with the Cécile de Rothschild Trophy in her memory. The trophy is always kept at Morfontaine Golf Club.

Winners 

Source:

References

External links 
Fédération française de golf

Amateur golf tournaments
Golf tournaments in France